Esme Irene Tombleson  (née Lawson, 1 August 1917 – 30 July 2010) was a New Zealand politician of the National Party. An Australian child prodigy who recited Shakespeare, she had a career in theatre and ballet. During the war, her sharp mind and strong memory was recognised, and she became a civil servant. She came to New Zealand through marriage, and lived on rural land near Gisborne. She represented the  electorate in Parliament for 12 years, and was prominent as a campaigner for multiple sclerosis.

Early life
She was born in Sydney in 1917 and educated there. She received her education at the Sydney Church of England Girls Grammar School in Darlinghurst, the Sydney Conservatorium of Music, and the Imperial School of Ballet in London. She was taken around Australia as a child prodigy by her mother, reciting Shakespeare. She was involved in various ballet, opera and theatre companies. During World War II she served in the Women's Auxiliary Signalling Corps in Sydney, where her sharp memory was recognised. She became secretary of the Manpower Advisory Committee.

Rural life
She came to New Zealand in 1951 when she married Tom Tombleson, a Gisborne farmer. They had met at Franz Josef while on holiday. She was a headstrong person and as a public servant, she had been in a position of power. As she knew nothing about farming, this was an area where her husband was a clear superior to her, and she found the experience interesting.

She had to teach herself how to cook, created a massive flower garden without ever having been a gardener before, and taught rural children ballet. This was not fulfilling her, so she started to take an interest in politics.

Political career

She defeated the incumbent, Labour's Reginald Keeling, in the marginal seat. At the time, she was the only woman on the National caucus. After Mary Grigg and Hilda Ross, she was the third female National MP. Tombleson had a passion for fishing and when she was offered the role of Associate Minister of Social Welfare, she turned down the offer, as she wanted to be Minister of Fisheries.

She led the 1965 delegation to the 54th conference of the Inter-Parliamentary Union in Ottawa, Ontario, Canada; she was the first woman to lead a New Zealand delegation to the IPU.

Later life
Tombleson was a co-founder of the National Multiple Sclerosis (MS) Society in 1961. She was president of the organisation (1975–1982) and founded the Gisborne–East Coast branch in 1988. For many years, she was on the executive of the International Federation of the Multiple Sclerosis Society. She was able to control meetings, as she had learned during her theatre training how to project her voice. When her hearing got worse later in life, her voice grew even louder.

Tombleson was appointed a Companion of the Queen's Service Order for public services in the 1977 Queen's Silver Jubilee and Birthday Honours. She was awarded the New Zealand 1990 Commemoration Medal in 1990, and made a Commander of the Order of the British Empire in the 1993 New Year Honours, for services to multiple sclerosis and the community. Also in 1993, she was awarded the New Zealand Suffrage Centennial Medal. She received the "rarely awarded" gold medal for distinguished services to multiple sclerosis in 1987. She died on 30 July 2010 in Gisborne.

The MS Society of New Zealand offers Esme Tombleson Awards at its annual general meetings.

Notes

References

Women in Parliamentary Life 1970-1990: Hocken Lecture 1993 by Marilyn Waring, page 32 (Hocken Library, University of Otago, 1994) 

1917 births
2010 deaths
New Zealand National Party MPs
Australian emigrants to New Zealand
People from Gisborne, New Zealand
Women members of the New Zealand House of Representatives
Australian military personnel of World War II
Sydney Conservatorium of Music alumni
New Zealand Commanders of the Order of the British Empire
Companions of the Queen's Service Order
New Zealand MPs for North Island electorates
Members of the New Zealand House of Representatives
Unsuccessful candidates in the 1972 New Zealand general election
Recipients of the New Zealand Suffrage Centennial Medal 1993
People educated at Sydney Church of England Girls Grammar School